= Terry Real =

Family therapist and author

Terrence "Terry" Real
- Spouse: Belinda Berman
- Children: 2
- Website: terryreal.com

Terrence "Terry" Real (age 74 in 2024) is a family therapist. He has authored several books on topics of male depression and marriage, and founded the Relational Life Institute. Due to his work, Real has been featured in numerous articles and programs, including the New York Times, the Los Angeles Times, and Good Morning America.

== Ideas ==
Male Depression from Isolation. Real's first book, I Don't Want to Talk About It: Overcoming the Secret Legacy of Male Depression, was "an extended disquisition on male pain and loneliness, rooted in the belief that men are depressed because they’re terrible at intimacy."

Toxic Culture of Individualism. Real discussed his book, Us: Getting Past You and Me to Build a More Loving Relationship, in an interview with CNN in which he argued that the focus on individualism in modern culture has affected interpersonal relationships in a negative way.

== Works ==
- Real, Terrence (1997), I Don't Want to Talk About It: Overcoming the Secret Legacy of Male Depression, Scribner, ISBN 978-0684831022
- Real, Terrence (2001), How Can I Get Through to You?: Closing the Intimacy Gap Between Men and Women, Scribner, ISBN 978-0684868776
- Real, Terrence (2007), The New Rules of Marriage: What You Need to Know to Make Love Work, Ballantine Books, ISBN 978-1400064014
- Real, Terrence (2022). Us: Getting Past You and Me to Build a More Loving Relationship. Rodale Books (Goop Press). ISBN 978-0593233672.
